Johnny Reb and Billy Yank was a Sunday comic strip drawn by Frank Giacoia from November 18, 1956, to May 24, 1959. It was one of the last full page Sunday strips. The last full page appeared on September 22, 1957. On May 18, 1958, the title changed to Johnny Reb. Some Sundays were ghosted by other artists, including Jack Kirby and Joe Kubert.

Characters and story
The strip told the story of the American Civil War, roughly chronicling events that had taken place 95 years earlier. The first 11 stories (of 20) alternated between the adventures of Johnny Reb, who fought for the South, and Billy Yank, who fought for the North. They met briefly in the first story, and "Secret Staff Order Number 191" featured both characters. After that, Billy Yank appeared in only one additional story, "The Copperhead Strikes."

Stories
1956
Manassas
General Lyon
1957
Prison Boat
Fort Donaldson
Scalpers
Shiloh
Second Bull Run
Haven
Guerrillas
Court Martial
Hannibal the Mule
Secret Staff Order Number 191
Undercover Mission
1958
The Copperhead Strikes!
Lincoln
Angel Sabra
Under Cover
Alaska is a Woman
1959:
Socrates Graves
John Wilkes Booth
Spy (story incomplete when strip ended)

See also
Johnny Reb and Billy Yank, 1905 novel

References
The information for this article was obtained by direct reference to the Johnny Reb and Billy Yank comic strips.

American comic strips
Comics characters introduced in 1956
Comics set during the American Civil War
Comics set in the 19th century
Comic strip duos
1956 comics debuts
1959 comics endings
American comics characters